Sphingomyelin phosphodiesterase 2 is an enzyme that in humans is encoded by the SMPD2 gene.

References

Further reading